Royal Air Force Barford St John or RAF Barford St John is a Royal Air Force station just north of the village of Barford St. John, Oxfordshire, England.  It is now a non-flying facility, operated by the United States Air Force as a communications centre with many large communications aerials, and is a satellite of RAF Croughton.

History

RAF use
RAF Barford St John was opened on 30 July 1941 as a training facility for RAF Flying Training Command.  It had three grass runways, used primarily by Airspeed Oxfords of No. 15 Service Flying Training School RAF from RAF Kidlington. The airfield was rebuilt as an RAF Bomber Command airfield with paved runways and night operations equipment and reopened as a satellite for RAF Upper Heyford in December 1942. In 1943 the station served as flight test centre for its Gloster E.28/39 and Gloster Meteor jet aircraft. Bomber Command and  No. 16 Operational Training Unit was stationed there with Vickers Wellingtons until December 1944. No. 1655 Mosquito Training Unit RAF replaced the Wellingtons at that time. After the war the airfield was closed in 1946 and placed into care and maintenance.

The site was used for some background filming for the 1949 film Twelve O'Clock High.

The following units were also there at some point:
 No. 4 Squadron RAF
 Satellite for No. 21 Heavy Glider Conversion Unit RAF (December 1944)
 No. 169 Squadron RAF
 No. 170 Squadron RAF

USAF use
In 1951 the United States Air Force opened a communications (transmitter) centre on the airfield. The site has a Scope Signal III installation which was used to modernize "Giant Talk", Strategic Air Command's world-wide command and controls network, which operates from RAF Croughton.

See also

List of Royal Air Force stations
United States Air Forces in Europe – Air Forces Africa

References

Citations

Bibliography

Royal Air Force stations in Oxfordshire
Installations of the United States Air Force in the United Kingdom
Royal Air Force stations of World War II in the United Kingdom
Military airbases established in 1941
1941 establishments in England